The following list is a list of football stadiums in Turkey. The stadiums with a capacity of at least 5,000 are ranked in order of capacity.

Current stadiums

Football clubs in Bold: Süper Lig (2022–2023) clubs.

Future stadiums

Under construction

Proposed

New stadiums built after 2000

See also
List of association football stadiums by capacity
List of European stadiums by capacity
List of Asian stadiums by capacity

Notes

References

Football
 
Turkey